Louis Darquier (19 December 1897 – 29 August 1980), better known under his assumed name Louis Darquier de Pellepoix, was Commissioner-General for Jewish Affairs under the Vichy Régime.

Biography 
A veteran of World War I, Darquier had been active in Fascist and antisemitic politics in France in the 1930s, being a member, at various times, of Action Française, Croix-de-Feu and Jeunesses Patriotes. On 6 February 1934 he was injured at the Place de la Concorde riot, and, according to Janet Maslin, writing in The New York Times in 2006, "parlayed (his) new status as a 'man of 6 February' into a leadership role." (The NYT article was based on the publication by Carmen Callil of her highly praised book on Darquier called 'Bad Faith'.) During this period Darquier began collaborating with the noted antisemitic publisher Ulrich Fleischhauer's Welt-Dienst (World-Service or Service Mondial) organization based in Erfurt, Germany. 

Darquier's extreme views were well-publicized. In 1937, he said, at a public meeting, "We must, with all urgency, resolve the Jewish problem, whether by expulsion, or massacre." A British report in 1942 called him "one of the most notorious anti-semites in France". At Nazi Germany's behest, he was appointed to head Vichy's Commissariat-General for Jewish Affairs in May 1942, succeeding Xavier Vallat, whom the SS in France found too moderate. Darquier's ascent to this post immediately preceded the first mass deportations of Jews from France to concentration camps. He was fired in February 1944 when, in Nicholas Fraser's words, "his greed and incompetence could no longer be countenanced." His successor was Charles du Paty de Clam.He was sentenced to death in absentia in 1947 by the French High Court of Justice for collaboration. However, he had by then fled to Spain, where the Fascist regime of Francisco Franco protected him.

In 1978, a French journalist from L'Express magazine interviewed him. Among other things, Darquier declared that in Auschwitz, gas chambers were not used to kill humans, but only lice, and that allegations of killings by this method were lies by the Jews. When L'Express published the interview, it caused an immediate scandal. The extradition of Darquier was requested, but was refused by Spain. The incident raised awareness of the persecution of French Jews during the Holocaust.

The English psychiatrist Anne Darquier was his daughter by his Australian wife, Myrtle Jones. She was abandoned by her parents as a child in the 1930s when she was left with a London nanny.

See also
 Union générale des israélites de France

References
{{reflist|refs=
<ref name=brewis>Brewis, Kathy (19 March 2006) The villain of Vichy France, Sunday Times.</ref>

}}

Cited sources
 Fraser, Nicholas (2006) "Toujours Vichy: a reckoning with disgrace," Harper's, pp. 86–94. Review of two books, including Callil, Bad Faith.

Further reading

 Peter Conrad, Vile days in Vichy, The Observer, 26 March 2006. Accessed online 11 October 2006.
 Encyclopedia of the Holocaust Darquier de Pellepoix, Louis. 
 David A. Bell, "The Collaborator," The Nation, 11 December 2006, pp. 28–36. Review of Bad Faith by Carmen Callil, includes a summary of that book.
 Frederick Brown, The Embrace of Unreason: France, 1914–1940'' (Knopf, 2014.)

1897 births
1980 deaths
People from Cahors
French military personnel of World War I
French collaborators with Nazi Germany
People sentenced to death in absentia
People convicted of treason against France
French exiles
Holocaust perpetrators in France
Antisemitism in France
French anti-communists
French Holocaust deniers
French politicians convicted of crimes